Gardashoba is a village and municipality in the Khachmaz District of Azerbaijan. It has a population of 1,384. The municipality consists of the villages of Gardashoba, Agharahimoba, and Hajiisaoba.

References

Populated places in Khachmaz District